Nicole Yance Borromeo (born December 9, 2000) is a Filipino model and beauty pageant titleholder who was crowned Binibining Pilipinas International 2022. She will represent the Philippines at the Miss International 2023 competition.

Early life and education
Borromeo is a native of Guadalupe, Cebu City, Cebu, Philippines.

She finished high school in Cebu Doctors' University in Mandaue, Cebu, Philippines. She pursued a bachelor's degree in interior design at the University of San Carlos.

Pageantry

Miss Silka Cebu 2017
On October 14, 2017, she was crowned Miss Silka Cebu 2017 at the Robinsons Galleria Cebu Activity Center in Cebu, Philippines.

Miss Mandaue 2018
On May 16, 2018, she placed 1st Runner-Up to Gabriella Carballo at the Miss Mandaue 2018 pageant at the Mandaue Cultural and Sports Complex in Mandaue, Cebu, Philippines.

Sinulog Festival Queen 2019
On January 18, 2019, she was crowned Sinulog Festival Queen 2019 at the Cebu City Sports Center in Cebu, Philippines.

Reyna ng Aliwan 2019
On April 28, 2019, she was crowned Reyna ng Aliwan 2019 at the Cultural Center of the Philippines Complex in Pasay, Metro Manila, Philippines. She was dethroned later on due to breach of contract.

Miss Teen Philippines 2019
On May 8, 2019, she represented Carcar, Cebu at the Miss Teen Philippines 2019 pageant and placed 2nd Runner-Up to Nikki de Moura of Cagayan de Oro.

Eat Bulaga's Miss Millennial Philippines 2019
On October 26, 2019, she was crowned Miss Millennial Philippines 2019, a tourism beauty pageant segment of the Philippines' longest-running variety show, Eat Bulaga! at the Meralco Theater in Pasig, Metro Manila, Philippines.

Binibining Pilipinas 2022
On July 31, 2022, she represented Cebu at the Binibining Pilipinas 2022 pageant and was crowned Binibining Pilipinas International 2022 succeeding Hannah Arnold of Masbate.

Miss International 2023
She will represent the Philippines at the Miss International 2023 pageant.

References

External links
Binibining Pilipinas Official Website

2000 births
Living people
Binibining Pilipinas winners
Cebuano beauty pageant winners
Filipino female models
People from Cebu
Cebuano people